Zygogynum oligostigma is a species of plant in the family Winteraceae. It is endemic to New Caledonia.  It is threatened by habitat loss.

References

Endemic flora of New Caledonia
oligostigma
Endangered plants
Taxonomy articles created by Polbot